Liliana Díaz  Mindurry (born 1953) is an Argentine writer.

Biography
Liliana Díaz Mindurry was born in Buenos Aires, Argentina in 1953. She earned a law degree at the University of Buenos Aires, where she had previously taught philosophy of law. She was forced to flee to France during the military dictatorship. She stayed there for seven years, until democracy was restored to Argentina. Since then, she has devoted herself exclusively to writing. She leads the literary group Malosayres. She has received several prizes.

Since 1989, she has coordinated literary workshops at various institutions and since the mid-1980s she has been publishing steadily  a personal narrative with a strong poetic tone.

She has been translated into German and Greek. Some of her poems have been published in Medellin, Colombia, and Salzburg, Austria.

Awards and honours
Juan Rulfo Prize (1993 and 1994)
First Municipal Prize of Buenos Aires (1991)
First prize, Embassy of Greece (1990)
Antorchas Foundation Prize (1991)
First prize, National Fund for the Arts (1994)
Planeta Prize (1998)
Mexican Cultural Center prize

Works
Buenos Aires, ciudad de la magia y de la muerte (1985), La resurrección de Zagreus (1988), La estancia del sur (1990), Sinfonía en llamas (1990), Paraíso en tinieblas (1991), En el fin de las palabras (1992), A cierta hora (1993), Retratos de infelices (1993), Wonderland (1993), Lo extraño (1994), Ultimo tango en Malos Ayres (1998), Lo indecible (1998), Pequeña música nocturna (1998), Summertime (2000), Hace Miedo Aquí.

External links
 Onetti a las seis (stories) 
 Paraíso en tinieblas (poetry) 
 Pequeña Música Nocturna (novel) 
Diario La Nación interview
Diario Clarín interview
Mujer Bonita interview
De Todo Un Poco interview
Agencia NAN interview

Argentine women poets
Living people
1953 births